The Kronia was an Athenian festival held in honor of Kronos (Cronus) on the 12th day of Hekatombaion, the first month of the Attic calendar, and roughly equivalent to the latter part of July and first part of August.

The festival was also celebrated in parts of Ionia, and in these places the month was called Kronion, named after the festival. Scholars usually interpret it as a celebration of the mid-summer (first) harvest.

Details from ancient sources
The Roman playwright Accius says that to celebrate the Kronia, "In nearly all fields and towns they happily feast upon banquets, and everyone waits upon his own servants." Slaves and the free, rich and poor, all dined together and played games.

The freedom from work and social egalitarianism enjoyed on the day represented the conditions of the mythical Golden Age, when Kronos (Cronus) still ruled the world. In the Golden Age, the earth had spontaneously supported human life, and since labor was unneeded, slavery had not existed.  William Hansen describes the Golden Age of Kronos as "a period of thorough harmony in which hierarchical, exploitative, and predatory relationships were nonexistent."

The Kronia was a time for social restraints to be temporarily forgotten. Slaves were released from their duties, and participated in the festivities alongside the slave-owners. Slaves were "permitted to run riot through the city, shouting and making a noise." Other than the Kronia, there is only limited evidence of religious devotion to Kronos (Cronus).

See also
 Kronos (Cronus)
 Saturn (mythology)
 Saturnalia

Footnotes

References
 

Festivals in ancient Athens
Cronus
July observances
August observances